Hook Common and Bartley Heath is a  biological Site of Special Scientific Interest on the southern outskirts of Hook in Hampshire, England. It is managed by the Hampshire and Isle of Wight Wildlife Trust.

This site is of particular interest because of its extensive areas of wet heath, which rarely survives in the Thames Basin. There are also areas of dry heath  and oak and birch woodland. There is a rich invertebrate assemblage, including the Red Data Book moths Stenoptila graphodactyla and Idaea dilutaria,  and the hoverfly Microdon mutabilis.

References

 

Hampshire and Isle of Wight Wildlife Trust
Sites of Special Scientific Interest in Hampshire